Yannick Jankovits and Luca Margaroli were the defending champions but chose not to defend their title.

Sriram Balaji and Vishnu Vardhan won the title after defeating Yuya Kibi and Shuichi Sekiguchi 6–3, 6–3 in the final.

Seeds

Draw

References
 Main Draw

Fergana Challenger - Men's Doubles
2017 Men's Doubles